Turkey Creek  is a shopping complex and mixed-use commercial development located in western Knox County, Tennessee, in the cities of Knoxville and Farragut.

Overview
The development stretches for  adjacent to a concurrent section of Interstates 40 and 75, spanning the distance between the Lovell Road and Campbell Station Road interchanges. Both were developed by Colonial Properties. A city of Knoxville greenway is located within the area, adjacent to the Turkey Creek wetland, which is managed by the Izaak Walton League.

History
The Turkey Creek development project started in 1995 when a group of investors and developers who called themselves Turkey Creek Land Partners led by John Turley and Kerry Sprouse paid $7 million to buy  of undeveloped land south of the interstate highway. Their project included $30 million of developer-funded infrastructure and other improvements. Publicly funded road and highway improvements in support of the project included widening of the Interstate, reconfiguring the Lovell Road interchange, and local street improvements, at a total cost of $50 million. The city of Knoxville spent about $5 million and Knox County government contributed $1 million to extend Parkside Drive from Lovell Road to Campbell Station Road.

References

External links
 
 The Pinnacle at Turkey Creek

Shopping malls in Tennessee
Buildings and structures in Knoxville, Tennessee
Economy of Knoxville, Tennessee
Tourist attractions in Knoxville, Tennessee
Neighborhoods in Knoxville, Tennessee

pt:Knoxville (Tennessee)